The 2015–16 Polish Cup was the 59th edition of the Polish Volleyball Cup tournament.

PGE Skra Bełchatów beat ZAKSA Kędzierzyn-Koźle in the final (3–2) and won its seventh Polish Cup.

Final four
 Venue: Hala Orbita, Wrocław
 All times are Central European Time (UTC+01:00).

Semifinals
|}

Final

|}

Final standings

Awards

Most Valuable Player	
  Mariusz Wlazły (PGE Skra Bełchatów)
Best Server
  Łukasz Wiśniewski (ZAKSA Kędzierzyn-Koźle)
Best Receiver	
  Facundo Conte (PGE Skra Bełchatów)
Best Defender
  Paweł Zatorski (ZAKSA Kędzierzyn-Koźle)
	
Best Blocker	
  Srećko Lisinac (PGE Skra Bełchatów)
Best Opposite Spiker
  Mariusz Wlazły (PGE Skra Bełchatów)
Best Setter
  Benjamin Toniutti (ZAKSA Kędzierzyn-Koźle)

See also
 2015–16 PlusLiga

References

External links
 Official website

Polish Cup
Polish Cup
Polish Cup
Polish Cup